Aron Mehzion (Asmara, 1970) is an Eritrean artist with German citizenship. Lives and works in Düsseldorf.

Life and works 
Mehzion left his hometown at the age of five, after his father died. Together with his mother, a skilled model maker, and his three brothers, he fled to Germany through Sudan, Egypt and Italy. After graduating from the Geschwister-Scholl-Gymnasium in Düsseldorf, he studied at the Kunstakademie Düsseldorf from 1993 to 2000. He was a pupil of Michael Buthe, Jannis Kounellis and Gerhard Merz.

Since he could not live on art alone, in 2002 he opened his first bar, called "Baron", in the "Barockschlösschen" in the Ehrenhof in Düsseldorf (Haus Ehrenhof 3). He inaugurated the bar with the exhibition entitled "hellgruen" (light green), making it a "living space for artists". When the bar premises were rented to the E.ON group for concerts, Ulrike Groos, the then director of the Kunsthalle Düsseldorf, and Rita Kersting, the then director of the Kunstverein for Rhineland and Westphalia, offered him an alternative room in the Kunsthalle Düsseldorf. With the collaboration of the students of the Academy Stefano Brivio and Detlef Weinrich, and of the artist friend Andreas Gursky who donated black armchairs as furniture, in 2004 he founded the Lounge: Salon des Amateurs. The bar has developed, also through the "Approximation Festival" started together with Volker Bertelmann in 2005, into a well-known night club for live acts of electronic music and new improvisation.Thomas H. Green: Oddball and Tribalistic: Salon Des Amateurs is the Club Night in Its Own League. A forward-thinking shelter from Dusseldorf's pissed-up nightlife. Mixmag, 30 August 2017, retrieved 29 December 2019

As a visual artist, Mehzion deals "with physical and mathematical questions of mirror symmetry, taking into account considerations on four-dimensional spaces". He is particularly interested in the temporal dimension of objects, which he pursues with impressions and impressions on tabletop installations.

Selected exhibitions 

 2010: Aron Mehzion, Showroom Tina Miyake, Düsseldorf
 2016: Schaf und Ruder/Wool and Water, Gemeinschaftsausstellung in der Kunsthalle Düsseldorf Lili Dujourie, Isa Genzken, Astrid Klein, Mischa Kuball, Reinhard Mucha, Gerhard Richter, Elaine Sturtevant und Rosemarie Trockel
 2016: Inverresion, Galerie Marzona, Berlin
 2018: parallélisme élémentaire, Galerie Marzona, Berlin
 2018: Four Rooms with a View, Galerija Vartai, Vilnius, Litauen

Bibliography 

 Gregor Jansen (Hrsg.): Schaf und Ruder – wool and water. Distanz, Berlin 2016, S. 123.

External links 

 Aron Mehzion, Kurzbiografie im Portal danielmarzona.com
 Aron Mehzion, Auktionsresultate im Portal artnet.de

References 

Eritrean artists
1970 births
Living people